Maria Asenina of Bulgaria was a Bulgarian princess and empress consort. She was the consort of Emperor Mitso Asen of Bulgaria (reigned 1256–1257).

She was the daughter of Emperor Ivan Asen II of Bulgaria and Empress Irene Komnene of Epirus.  Through her mother, she was a granddaughter of Theodore of Epirus. She is mother of Bulgarian Emperor Ivan Asen III (r. 1279–1280) and of Bulgarian Empress Kira Maria, who married Emperor George I of Bulgaria.

References

Bulgarian consorts
Bulgarian princesses
13th-century Bulgarian women
13th-century births
13th-century deaths
Asen dynasty
Daughters of emperors